The SS Richmond P. Hobson (Hull # 1994) was an American World War II Liberty ship built by North Carolina Shipbuilding Company, Wilmington, North Carolina. She was operated by Isbrandtsen Line as a limited troopship Carrier starting in 1943 under  charter with the Maritime Commission and War Shipping Administration.

History
After the war in 1947 she was sold to Cia.Faralon de Nav. a Panamanian flag and renamed Nueva Esperanza. In 1953 she was sold to Boyd, Weir & Sewell of New York. In 1954 she was sold to Fafalios Ltd of London. In 1961 she was sold to Jugoslavenska Slobodna Plovidba, Polce. a Yugoslav flag and renamed Trebisnjica. She was shipwrecked July 17, 1963 on Hogsty Reef, Southern Bahamas. She was declared a total Loss.

References

External links 
 SS Trebisnjica (+1963)

Liberty ships
1943 ships